The Pokot people (also spelled Pökoot) live in West Pokot County and Baringo County in Kenya and in the Pokot District of the eastern Karamoja region in Uganda. They form a section of the Kalenjin ethnic group and speak the Pökoot language, which is broadly similar to the related Marakwet, Nandi, Tuken and other members of the Kalenjin language group.

History

Origins
Pokot identity formed in the Kerio Valley perhaps as early as the late 18th and certainly not later than the mid 19th century. It emerged from the assimilation of the Sirkwa era Chok by the Pokotozek section of the Maliri.

Assimilation
Early 20th century accounts of the Pokot identify two distinct branches of the community with the caveat that much as two ways of life are detailed, they were one people.

Beech (1911) identified significant differences between agricultural and pastoral sections of the Pokot in; oaths, punishment for murder and homicide, punishment for assault, punishment for witchcraft, punishment for theft and robbery, marriage & divorce, recourse in case of unpaid debt and land tenure. He however notes that "it must be therefore borne in mind that, although written of here as two distinct sections, the hill and pastoral Suk are essentially the same".

Social organisation
Even in the early stages of assimilation, there were no notable differences in matters of social organisation, initiation or governance between the two Pokot groupings. Socially, Pokot men were divided into three groupings; Karachona or boys, Muren or circumcised men and Poi or old men. Boys once circumcised would join an age-set.

Inter-tribal relations
The Turkana and Pokot ethnic groups have organized cattle raids against each other. The two groups have been through numerous periods of war and peace.

Recent history

Demographics
The number of Pokot speakers in Kenya has been estimated at 783,000 (last Kenyan census carried out in 2009) while the number of Pokot speakers in Uganda is estimated at 130,000.

Culture

Folklore
Verbal art is very important among the Pokot. Proverbs are used with versatility both to teach and to make a point. At a gathering of elders, a person may use proverbs to show what a good speaker he is. They are also used to teach younger people the consequences of straying from the moral path. A popular tale, that of the Louwialan clan, is told to warn against pride. Another common tale is that of the blind girl who returns from death
. Riddles(Tyangoi) are mostly used as a way of sharpening children's wits and capturing their attention during story-telling time.

The Pokot have various, descriptive terms for different classes of speech that man engages in. These are as follows;

Lökoi: News of other places

Chiran: News of going on's in the neighborhood

Kokwö: Serious conversations of a business-like nature

Kiruok: Conversations of legal nature (from this stems, kiruokot, a legal specialist)

Ng'öliontoköny: Talk of olden times

Even with the introduction of Western education, the Pokot still use folklore as a means of teaching.

Customs
In November 2014 there was public outrage abroad when pictures of circumcision of young Pokot girls were published in the West, despite Kenya's legal ban on the practice.

Notable personalities
Key personalities of recent times from the community include:

Tegla Loroupe, who in 2012 appeared in the African top 100 personalities of the year. 

Stephen Cheptai Lomeri the first elected Pokot Member of Parliament in the Tugen dominated Baringo County.

 Late Francis Polisi Loile Lotodo ,(Pokot kingpin)

Kamama Asman Abongutum is another key personality from Tiaty constituency, because of the positive contribution he has achieved since he captured power, currently chairman of parliamentary select committee on security under the Ministry of interior and co-ordination of national security.

Simon Kachapin 1st Governor, West Pokot County

John Krop Lonyangapuo  2nd Governor West Pokot County

Samuel Poghisio Senator West Pokot County

Pkech dini ya roho -msambwa  Started the dini ya roho church. He was assasinated by the colonialist in what it came to be known kolowa massacre where hundreds lost their lives.

References

Further reading
Baroja, Tomás Herreros 1998. Pökot-English, English-Pökot Dictionary, ed. Kacheliba. 
Beech, M. W. H. (1911). The Suk. Oxford: Clarendon Press.
Bianco, Barbara 1992. The Historical Anthropology of a Mission Hospital in Northwestern Kenya. A Ph.D. dissertation New York University.

Bolling, Michael 1996. Bridewealth and Stockfriendship, the Accumulation of Security through Reciprocal Exchange." In Angewandte Sozialforschung, 1996–1997, Vol. 20: (1-2) 57-72.
Cox, P. S. V. 1972. The Disease Pattern of the Karapokot and its Relationship to Their Environment and Culture.  A dissertation for the degree of Doctor of Medicine. University of London.
Dietz, T. 1987. Pastoralists in Dire Straits; Survival Strategies and External Strategies, Interventions in a Semi-Arid Region at the Kenya/Uganda Border: Western Pokot, 1900-1986.  A Ph.D. dissertation University of Amsterdam.
 Kjartan Jonsson 2006. Pokot Masculinity, The Role of Rituals in Forming Men. A Ph.D. dissertation, Reykjavik: University of Iceland, Faculty of Social Sciences.
Meyerhoff, Elisabeth L. 1981. The Socio-Economic and Ritual Roles of Pokot women. A Ph.D. dissertation, Lucy Cavendish College, Cambridge.

 Reckers, Ute 1992. Nomadische Viehalter in Kenya : die Ost-Pokot aus human-ökologischer Sicht (Arbeiten aus dem Institut für Afrika-Kunde vol. 83). Hamburg: Institut für Afrika-Kunde im Verbund der Stiftung Deutsches Übersee-Institut. 
Reynolds, John Eric 1982. Community Development, Ethnicity and Stratification in a Rural Destination: Mnagei, Kenya.  A Ph.D. dissertation, University of Washington.
 Schladt, Matthias 1997. Kognitive Strukturen von Körperteilvokabularien in Kenianischen Sprachen (Afrikanistische Monographien vol. 8). Köln: Institut für Afrikanistik / Universität zu Köln. (esp. pp. 40–42)
 Schneider, Harold K. 1953. The Pakot (Suk) of Kenya, with Special Reference to the Role of Livestock in Their Subsistence Economy. PhD Dissertation, Northwestern University.
Tully, Dorene R. 1985. Human Ecology and Political Process: The Context of Market Incorporation in West-Pokot District, Kenya. A Ph.D. dissertation, University of Washington.
Visser, J.J. 1989. Pökoot Religion. Oegstgeest: Hendrik Kraemer Institut.

External links
Pökoot language on the Ethnologue
Pokot people on the Art&Life in Africa index of UIOWA.
Kalenjin Online - Pokot

Ethnic groups in Uganda
Kalenjin